Emmanuel Bourdieu (born 6 April 1965 in Paris) is a French writer, playwright, film director and philosopher. He is the youngest son of Marie Claire Brizard and sociologist Pierre Bourdieu.

Biography 

While a student at Lycée Henri-IV, he met Denis Podalydès who belonged to the drama club of Lycée Fénelon.

An alumnus of the École Normale Supérieure (Ulm), he earned a PhD in philosophy. He taught philosophy courses at the University of Bordeaux III and assistant in linguistics at the University of Paris VII. He participated in Cerisy conference on "American Philosophy."

During his studies, he met Jeanne Balibar and Arnaud Desplechin, with whom, together with Mathieu Amalric, Emmanuelle Devos, Denis and Bruno Podalydès, he created the group of young filmmakers and intellectuals called 'Rive Gauche'.

Emmanuel Bourdieu began his writing career in the theatre with the play Tout mon possible (All I Can) and Je crois (I Believe), put on in 1998 by Denis Podalydès. He then wrote for film with Arnaud Desplechin (My Sex Life... or How I Got into an Argument, Esther Kahn, A Christmas Tale), Nicole Garcia (Vendôme) and Catherine Corsini (The New Eve).

He started directing in 1998 with a short film called Venise (Venice), followed by Candidature (Candidacy) for which he won the Prix Jean Vigo (2001) and the César Award for Best Short Film (2003).

In his first feature film, released simultaneously in cinemas under the title Vert Paradis (Green Paradise) and broadcast on Arte as Les Cadets de Gascogne. It is based on the sociological work of his father in The Bachelors' Ball: The Crisis of Peasant Society in Béarn.

In 2006, Les Amitiés maléfiques (Poison Friends) received the Grand Prix of the Critics at Cannes Film Festival.

Cinema

As actor

 2004: Le Pont des Arts by Eugène Green, playing a spectator at the Noh performance

As director of photography 

 2001: Les Trois Théâtres (The Three Theatres) by Emmanuel Bourdieu

As short film director 

 1998: Venise (Venice)
 2001: Les Trois Théâtres (The Three Theatres)
 2001: Candidature (Candidacy)

As a feature film director 

 2003: Vert Paradis (Green Paradise)
 2006: Les Amitiés maléfiques (Poison Friends)
 2006: Mascarade (Masquerade)
 2008: Intrusions
 2013: Drumont, histoire d'un antisémite français (Drumont: The Story of a French Anti-Semite) – historical TV movie about Édouard Drumont
 2016: Louis-Ferdinand Céline - adapted from Milton Hindus' 1950 book on French author Louis-Ferdinand Céline

As writer or co-writer 

 1996: My Sex Life... or How I Got into an Argument  by Arnaud Desplechin
 1998: Vendôme by Nicole Garcia
 1998: The New Eve by Catherine Corsini
 2000: Esther Kahn by Arnaud Desplechin
 2000: Bronx-Barbes by Eliane de Latour
 2001: Les Trois Théâtres
 2001: Candidature
 2003: Playing 'In the Company of Men' by Arnaud Desplechin
 2003: Vert Paradis, scenario by Denis Podalydès and Marcia Romano
 2006: Les Amitiés maléfiques
 2008: A Christmas Tale by Arnaud Desplechin
 2008: Intrusions

Theatre

As writer and director of plays 

 1996: Parce qu'il est comme ça (Because It Is Like This)
 1997: Les Grands Esprits se rencontrent (The Great Spirits Meet)
 1998: Tout mon possible (All I Can)
 2002: Je crois (I Believe), staging by Denis Podalydès
 2007: Le Mental de l’équipe (The Mind of the Team) by Emmanuel Bourdieu and Frédéric Bélier-Garcia, staging by Denis Podalydès and Frédéric Bélier-Garcia, Théâtre du Rond-Point
 2010: Le Cas Jekyll (The Jekyll Case) by Christine Montalbetti, directed by Emmanuel Bourdieu and Eric Ruf, Théâtre national de Chaillot
 2013: L'Homme qui se hait (The Man Who Hates) by Emmanuel Bourdieu, directed by Denis Podalydès and Emmanuel Bourdieu, Théâtre national de Chaillot.

Literature 
 Mes parents (My Parents), 3-volume boxed set by Serge Lalou, Richard Bean and Emmanuel Bourdieu (8 April 2005)
 Je crois (I Believe) by Emmanuel Bourdieu (26 February 2002)
 Esther Kahn (Bilingual scenario) by Arnaud Desplechin and Emmanuel Bourdieu (Sep 2000)

Awards 
 2001 Prix Jean Vigo to Candidature
 2003: Candidature, nominated for the César Award for Best Short Film
 2003: Vert Paradis: Prize of the international press at the Festival of Geneva 2003
 2006: Les Amitiés maléfiques: Grand Prix of the International Critics' Week

References 

1965 births
Living people
Lycée Henri-IV alumni
École Normale Supérieure alumni
French theatre directors
Film directors from Paris
20th-century French dramatists and playwrights
21st-century French dramatists and playwrights
Academic staff of the University of Bordeaux